Zygmunt Latoszewski (1902 in Poznań – 1995 in Warsaw) was a Polish conductor, theater director, and music teacher. He was a conductor and director of many of Polish operas and philharmonics.

References
 Zygmunt Latoszewski

1902 births
1995 deaths
Polish conductors (music)
Male conductors (music)
20th-century conductors (music)
20th-century male musicians